Thiago Ezequiel Almada (born 26 April 2001) is an Argentine professional footballer who plays as an attacking midfielder and winger for Major League Soccer club Atlanta United and the Argentina national team.

Early life 
Thiago 'Guayo' Ezequiel Almada was born on 26 April 2001, in Ciudadela, Buenos Aires in Argentina. He grew up in the neighbourhood of Fuerte Apache, which is known for high crime rates and prevalent drug use. Almada spent many of his early years selling fruit and vegetables door-to-door to earn extra money. Much time was spent with his grandparents while his parents worked.

Club career

Vélez Sarsfield 
At the age of four, Almada played football for a local club, Santa Clara, where Carlos Tevez also began his career. He was picked up by Vélez Sarsfield at age five, where he made his way through the youth academy. In August 2018, just four months shy of his 17th birthday, Almada made his professional debut with the club. In October 2018, he was included in The Guardian's "Next Generation 2018".

Almada began his first-team career as a wing forward under manager Gabriel Heinze. He played alongside Matías Vargas, Nicolás Domínguez, Lucas Robertone, and Fernando Gago. In his first two years with Heinze at the helm, Almada appeared in 46 matches and tallied nine goals. In 2020, new club manager Mauricio Pellegrino moved Almada to midfielder, due to the departure of several players. In the two seasons since the move to midfield, Almada earned 15 goals in 42 matches.

Atlanta United

Signing and 2022 season 
On 4 December 2021, Vélez Sarsfield announced that it had reached an agreement with Major League Soccer club Atlanta United for the pre-transfer of Almada in February 2022. The transfer, reportedly worth a league-record $16 million, was officially announced by Atlanta on 9 February 2022.

On 10 February 2022, Atlanta United officially announced the transfer of Almada with a series of photos on the club's Instagram page, showing him with the club's president Darren Eales at the Hartsfield-Jackson International Airport in Atlanta. Shortly afterward, Almada was unveiled in the club's kit for the very first time in front of thousands of fans in a virtual welcome ceremony (due to the ongoing COVID-19 pandemic).

On 11 February 2022, Almada came under scrutiny from supporters in Atlanta after it was revealed that in his final match for Sarsfield, he had scored a goal and celebrated with a racially insensitive gesture with his eyes, this raised many concerns for the club, and his future, but he had apologized shortly after being asked about the situation.

On 14 February 2022, Almada made his official debut for Atlanta wearing the number 8 in a pre-season match versus Mexican outfit C.D. Guadalajara during Atlanta's pre-season tour of Mexico. Atlanta would end up losing the match 3–0.

On 15 March 2022, Almada made his MLS debut against expansion team Charlotte FC as a substitute in Atlanta's win against them, 2–1. Almada had 18 touches in 34 minutes; he said, "I wanted to be here” and “I wanted to get to know everybody. It worked out well in the end. I’m here. I’m ready to fight for everything that we have to fight for.” Shortly after the Charlotte FC game, on 19 March 2022, Almada scored his first ever MLS goal in a 3–3 draw vs CF Montréal. The goal would end up winning the MLS' Goal of The Week contest for Matchday 4.

2023 season 
On 25 February 2023, Almada scored two goals (one of which was a free kick) in the first game of the 2023 season, helping Atlanta gain a 2–1 win over San Jose Earthquakes. As a result, Almada was named MLS Player of the Week, as well as being featured in the league's Team of the Matchday.

International career
Almada played for the Argentina under-20 squad in 2019, before featuring for the under-23 squad in 2021.

His debut in the Argentina national football team came on 23 September 2022, in Miami, during a friendly match against Honduras. 

In November 2022, Almada was officially called up to the Argentinian World Cup squad to replace injured Joaquín Correa, only five days before Argentina’s first game of the tournament. He was a member of the squad that ultimately won the tournament, becoming the first active MLS player to win a World Cup.

Personal life 
In February 2021, Almada was identified as a person of interest by local authorities after a party in San Isidro, Buenos Aires on 4 December 2020. A 28-year-old woman said several people sexually abused her in a house rented by Juan Martín Lucero. After the investigation became public, his club suspended both him and Miguel Brizuela. A week after Almada was suspended, he was reinstated with the club stating, "substantial modifications were generated by virtue of the incorporation of new evidence, expertise and testimonies."

Career statistics

Club

International

Honours
Argentina

 FIFA World Cup: 2022

Individual
MLS Newcomer of the Year: 2022

References

2001 births
Living people
Argentine footballers
Argentina youth international footballers
Argentina international footballers
Association football midfielders
Argentine Primera División players
Club Atlético Vélez Sarsfield footballers
Olympic footballers of Argentina
Footballers at the 2020 Summer Olympics
Sportspeople from Buenos Aires Province
Atlanta United FC players
2022 FIFA World Cup players
FIFA World Cup-winning players
Designated Players (MLS)
Argentine expatriate footballers
Argentine expatriate sportspeople in the United States
Major League Soccer players